Il 1966 Campeonato Argentino de Rugby   was won by selection of Buenos Aires beating in the final the selection of Tucumán

That year in Argentina rugby union 
 The Buenos Aires Champsionship was won by Belgrano AC
 The Cordoba Province Championship was won by La Tablada
 The North-East Championship was won by Los Tarcos
The "Unión de Rugby del Norte" take definitely the name of Unión de Rugby de Tucumán
The "Gazelles", Under-23 South African selection visit Argentina

Knock out stages

Semifinals 

 Tucuman:  C. Ponce, G. Casanova, H. Barbero, A. Alonso, N. Antoni, W. Rumboll, J. Frías Silva, J. Paz, J. Ghirin¬ghelli, J. C. Ghiringhelli, J. Lomáscolo, S. Bellomio, S. Poujade, R. Roldán, M. Gasparre. 
Rosario J. Seaton, E. España, G. Escobar, J. Scilabra, J. Bresciaroli, J. Caballero, C. Cristi, M. Chesta, R. Seaton, R. Esmendi, M. Bouza, L. Belizan, M. Pavón, J. Costante, J. Imhoff. 

 Cordoba D. Morgán, C. Cornille, A. Pagano, M. Pascual, E. Neri, R. Cazenave, A. Etchegaray, R. Loyola, E. Elowson, G. Plesky, B. Otaño, L. García Yáñez, G. Me Cormick, R. Handley, R. Foster. 
Buenos Aires F. Mezquida, R. Mule, J. Mancini, E. Quetglas, L. Rodríguez, C. Feretti, J. Del Valle, P. Demo, J. Masjoan, J. Ramírez, E. Cornella, J. Imasi, J. Coceo, C. Félix, G. Ribeca.

Final 

 Tucumàn: C. Ponce, G. Casanova, R. Cuello, A. Alonso, N. Antoni, F. Burgos, J. Frías Silva, J. Paz, J. Ghiringhelli, J. C. Ghiringhelli, E. Bellomio, H. Roldán, S. Poujade, R. Roldán, F. Bach.   Buenos Aires : D. Morgan, E. Neri, M. Pascual, A Pagano, C. Cornille, R. Cazenave, L. Gradín, L. García Yáñez, N. González del Solar, G. Me Cormick, B. Otaño, A. Anthony, A. Dunn, G. Plesky, R. Loyola.

Notes

External links 
Memorias de la UAR 1966
Rugby Archive

Campeonato Argentino de Rugby
Argentina
rugby